William Harold Strutton (23 February 1918 – 23 November 2003) was an Australian screenwriter and novelist. He worked on   television shows such as Ivanhoe, The Saint, The Avengers, Riptide and Doctor Who.

Early life
Born in South Australia, Bill Strutton won a state scholarship to university at 14 but dropped out after two years to work as an office clerk in Adelaide. At the outbreak of World War II, he joined the Australian army. He was captured by the Germans in Crete and sent to Stalag VII, learning to swear in several languages. It was there he also began to take an interest in writing. He once said: "My first year as a prisoner-of-war was the most interesting in my life. The ensuing three were the most boring, but more instructive, I think, than any university. I learned several languages: German from a Serbian horse-doctor; Spanish from a Basque; a Parisian taxi-driver bequeathed me a startling vocabulary. I also ran a camp newspaper, caught up on my reading, and finally celebrated my liberation by tearing up a novel." After being demobbed, he lived in England. In 1961, he lived with his Australian wife, Marguerite and two children in Woddingham, East Surrey.

Career
After the war, he began a career in journalism, and started to write military books in  the mid-fifties. These included The Secret Invaders, A Jury of Angels in 1957 and Island of Terrible Friends in 1961. Also, three films. In 1958, he scripted the Ivanhoe television series which starred Roger Moore. He wrote for more than fifteen television series in eleven years, the last of which was Strange Report, starring Anthony Quayle, and several episodes of Paul Temple before retiring in 1978 following a heart attack.

His Doctor Who story was The Web Planet in 1965. It is remembered as a unique Doctor Who serial. It was the first programme to feature a completely alien cast, including Martin Jarvis as a butterfly Menoptera, and introduced the menacing Zarbi. Two of its six episodes are amongst the handful of Doctor Who instalments to be seen by more than 13m people on original transmission. Strutton went on to adapt the serial as the third Doctor Who novel in 1965. In 1972, he submitted another storyline to Doctor Who entitled The Mega, but this was rejected. It was later adapted as an audio drama that was released in 2013.

Death
Bill Strutton died on 23 November 2003, the day of Doctor Who's fortieth anniversary,  aged 85 years.

References

External links

1918 births
2003 deaths
British television writers
British science fiction writers
British male screenwriters
Australian television writers
Australian screenwriters
20th-century Australian non-fiction writers
British male television writers
20th-century British screenwriters
20th-century Australian screenwriters
Australian Army personnel of World War II
Australian prisoners of war
World War II prisoners of war held by Germany
Australian male television writers